Kpaka is a chiefdom in Pujehun District of Sierra Leone with a population of 12,827. Its principal town is Massam.

References

Chiefdoms of Sierra Leone
Southern Province, Sierra Leone